Sherry Lynn Boucher (also known as Sherry Boucher Peppard or Sherry Boucher-Lytle; born July 25, 1945) is a former American actress. She currently works as a realtor.

Partial filmography 
 Prescription: Murder (TV movie – 1968) as Air Hostess
 White Lightning (1973) as Sherry Lynne
 Sisters of Death (1976) as Diane
 Five Days from Home (1978) as Wanda Dulac

References 

1945 births
People from Springhill, Louisiana
People from Bossier City, Louisiana
American businesspeople
Springhill High School (Louisiana) alumni
Northwestern State University alumni
University of Southern California alumni
Living people
People from Benton, Louisiana